Moufette is a Canadian indie rock group whose name is the French word for 'Skunk'.  They were formed in Montreal in 2004. The duo, which includes Steve Durand - formerly of Tinker and known for his work with Auf der Maur - and Ariel Engle, also mix electrionica and folk music in to their standard indie/pop sound. Their first album was released in 2005, and their first extended play was released in 2009.

Discography
Chew Your Heart (2005)
Pet the Lion (2009)

References

External links
Official Moufette MySpace
Moufette's online store @ CD Baby

Musical groups established in 2004
Musical groups from Montreal
2004 establishments in Quebec